Ekaterina Nikonova (born 25 April 2003) is a Russian swimmer. She competed in the women's 100 metre freestyle event at the 2021 FINA World Swimming Championships (25 m) in Abu Dhabi.

References

External links
 

2003 births
Living people
Russian female freestyle swimmers
Place of birth missing (living people)
21st-century Russian women